Harrogate Spring Water is a private limited company incorporated on 16 August 2000 which manufactures plastic and glass bottled spring water, from Harrogate, North Yorkshire, England and distributes its bottles all over the world. Spa waters were first discovered in Harrogate in the 16th century, with water bottled in glass only the town from the 1740s.

Sources
The main spring is sourced from an aquifer in the millstone grit series, below the Harrogate Pinewoods. The Thirsty Planet brand takes water from an aquifer located in sand and gravel.

History
Founded in August 2000, initially under the name HSW Limited, the product was launched in January 2002. Harrogate Spa Water manufactures bottled water and sells it locally, nationally and internationally, being exported to as far away as Australia.

A change in majority share owner distribution was made during 2020 resulting in Danone becoming the majority holder, displacing the Cain family from their ownership.

The company was previously owned by Harrogate Water Brands, which also owned the charity Thirsty Planet, producing its own brand of bottled water.

In 2021, a plan to expand the bottling plant over an area of woodland was criticised by Harrogate residents because Harrogate Spring Water sought to destroy an area of established woodland and natural habitat planted previously by volunteers and local primary school children.

Market
Harrogate Spring Water is a popular brand within the United Kingdom, selling over  annually in 2013, which was a market share of 1.4%. In 2019, the company achieved sales of £21.6 million. Furthermore, all major British airlines (i.e. British Airways, Virgin Atlantic, Jet2.com, TUI Airways, and Easyjet) provide Harrogate Water on their flights, and, in the case of British Airways, in their premium lounges at London Heathrow.

Harrogate Spring Water also supply water to the Masons Gin distillery in Aiskew, North Yorkshire.

References

External links
 https://find-and-update.company-information.service.gov.uk/company/04056786

Bottled water brands
Companies based in Harrogate
Mineral water
Groupe Danone brands